Impossible to Miss You is the 6th album by Taiwanese R&B artist and composer, Wang Leehom, and was released on 9 June 1999.

Track listing
 釣靈感
 不可能錯過你
 流淚手心
 Julia
 感情副作用
 打開愛
 不降落的滑翔翼
 你愛過沒有
 失去了你
 Happy Ending
 Mary Says

1999 albums
Wang Leehom albums
Sony Music Taiwan albums